The Hodges-Runyan-Brainard House is a historic house in Artesia, New Mexico. It was built in 1904 for John Hodges, a real estate developer who used artificial stone to build many houses in Artesia. The house was purchased by rancher David W. Runyan in 1916. Two years later, his daughter Mary moved in with her husband, Reed Brainard. It has been listed on the National Register of Historic Places since March 2, 1984.

The Hodges-Sipple House, another listed house in Artesia, was also built for John Hodges.

References

Houses completed in 1904
Houses on the National Register of Historic Places in New Mexico
National Register of Historic Places in Eddy County, New Mexico